The Sidney Powers Memorial Award  is a gold medal awarded by the American Association of Petroleum Geologists in recognition of distinguished and outstanding contributions to, or achievements in, petroleum geology.

Recipients
Source: AAPG

See also

 List of geology awards

References

Geology awards
Awards established in 1945
American awards